Manjoor can refer to:
 Manjur (instrument), a musical instrument in the Arab States of the Persian Gulf
 Manjoor (village), a village in Kottayam district, Kerala, India